Cardiopulmonary resuscitation (CPR) is an emergency procedure to assist someone who has suffered cardiac arrest.

CPR may also refer to:

Science and technology
Classification of Pharmaco-Therapeutic Referrals, a taxonomy to define situations requiring a referral from pharmacists to physicians
Continuous Plankton Recorder, marine biological monitoring program
Cubase Project Files, work files used in Steinberg Cubase
Cytochrome P450 reductase, an enzyme
Cursor Position Report, an ANSI X3.64 escape sequence
Candidate phyla radiation, bacteria precursors.
Competent Persons Report, in Oil and Gas; see Lancaster oilfield

Organizations
American Bar Association Model Code of Professional Responsibility
Center for Performance Research
Centre for Policy Research, a think tank in New Delhi, India
Chicago Project Room, former art gallery in Chicago and Los Angeles
Communist Party of Réunion, in the French département of Réunion
Communist Party of Russia (disambiguation), various meanings
Congress for the Republic, a Tunisian political party
Conservatives for Patients' Rights, a pressure group founded and funded by Rick Scott that argues for private insurance methods to pay for healthcare
Det Centrale Personregister (Civil Registration System), Denmark's nationwide civil registry

Transportation
Canadian Pacific Railway, serving major cities in Canada and the northeastern US
Car plate recognition, or automatic number plate recognition
Casper–Natrona County International Airport (IATA Code), in Casper, Wyoming, US 
Cornelius Pass Road, in Oregon, US
 Compact Position Reporting, a method of encoding an aircraft's latitude and longitude in ADS-B position messages

Entertainment and music
Chicago Public Radio, former name of WBEZ
Club Penguin Rewritten, 2017 fangame
Colorado Public Radio
CPR (band) or Crosby, Pevar & Raymond, a former rock/jazz band
CPR (album)
Corporate Punishment Records, a record label
CPR (EP), a 2003 EP by Dolour
"CPR", a song by CupcakKe from the album Queen Elizabitch

Other uses
 Calendar of the Patent Rolls, a book series translating and summarising the medieval Patent Rolls documents
 Chinese People's Republic, another alternate official name for China (UNDP country code CPR)
 Civil Procedure Rules, a civil court procedure rules for England and Wales
 Common-pool resource, a type of good, including a resource system
 Common property regime
 Concrete Pavement Restoration, a method used by the International Grooving & Grinding Association
 Conditional Prepayment Rate, a measurement for Prepayment of loan
 Condominium Property Regime, a type of condominium conversion common in Hawai'i
 Construction Products Regulation, Regulation (EU) No. 305/2011
 Critique of Pure Reason, a 1781 philosophical work by Immanuel Kant

See also
CPR-1000, a Generation II+ pressurized water reactor
 
Central Pacific Railroad (CPRR), between California and Utah, US